Delta Sigma Rho- Tau Kappa Alpha is a collegiate honor society devoted to the promotion of public speaking (forensics).

History

Both Delta Sigma Rho and Tau Kappa Alpha were founded as honorary forensic societies.

Delta Sigma Rho
Delta Sigma Rho was founded in Chicago on April 13, 1906. The founders at the organizing convention included representatives from University of Michigan, University of Minnesota, University of Iowa, University of Wisconsin, University of Illinois, University of Nebraska, University of Chicago and Northwestern University. The call for the meeting was issued by Professor Eugene E. McDermott of the University of Minnesota after several years correspondence with the heads of the departments of public speaking at the other seven schools during which the idea was fully discussed and approved. The idea of the society came out of the simultaneous conception of the idea by Professor McDermont and Professor H. E. Gordon of University of Iowa.

The Purpose of the society was "to encourage sincere and effective public speaking". As of 1920, the constitution provided that charters shall only be granted to those institutions which have for at least five years participated in intercollegiate contests per year.

The society had more than 80 chapters by 1956.

Delta Sigma Rho had for its emblem a diamond shaped key on which the Greek letters Delta Sigma Rho and the date of the organization of the society (1906) appear in relief.

Colors were maroon and black.

Tau Kappa Alpha
Tau Kappa Alpha was organized May 13, 1908, at Indianapolis, Ind., primarily through the efforts of Oswald Ryan, a student at Butler University and Hugh Thomas Miller, Lieutenant Governor of Indiana, assisted by James J. Boyle, G. Claris Adams, Herbert R. Hyman, William Heilman and Roger W. Wallace. The principal qualification for membership is participation in an Intercollegiate oratorical or debating contest. Members are elected by the several State Councils in their respective States, and Alumni of accredited institutions may also be elected. The scheme of organization was a peculiar one. Charters were not granted to institutions of learning as such, but to eligible persons in each State upon the petition of students from a representative institution or institutions in such State and expansion within that State was entrusted to the charter members of the State Chapter. The purpose of this plan was to enable the election of desirable men from colleges not large enough or perhaps not strong enough to warrant the installation of or to maintain a separate chapter. It was found to be impracticable and at a convention held in 1914 the society was reorganized and chapters given an independent existence in the usual way.

The professional fraternity, Phi Delta Gamma merged into Tau Kappa Alpha in 1935.

By 1958 it had 90 national chapters, and both men and women were admitted.

Colors were light and dark purple.

Combined
The Delta Sigma Rho and Tau Kappa Alpha merged on August 18, 1963.

Chapters of Delta Sigma Rho
Chapters of Delta Sigma Rho at the time of the Merger

References

Honor societies
Student organizations established in 1963
Former members of Association of College Honor Societies
1906 establishments in Illinois